Michel Joseph Dumas (born July 8, 1949) is a former Canadian professional ice hockey goaltender and current chief amateur scout for the Chicago Black Hawks. He spent most of his playing career with the Dallas Black Hawks in the Central Hockey League, where he was a two-time Second Team All-Star. Dumas played eight games in the National Hockey League in the mid-1970s with the Chicago Black Hawks.  His career was cut short after an eye injury while playing against the Colorado Rockies in 1976. Dumas was hired by the Black Hawks the following year as an amateur scout, and was promoted to chief amateur scout in the 1992–93 season.

Dumas was born in Saint-Antoine-de-Pontbriand, Quebec.

External links

1949 births
Living people
Canadian ice hockey goaltenders
Chicago Blackhawks players
Chicago Blackhawks scouts
Ice hockey people from Quebec
Sportspeople from Thetford Mines
Undrafted National Hockey League players